Globarene is a genus of sea snails, marine gastropod mollusks, in the family Liotiidae.

Species
Species within the genus Globarene include:
 Globarene cidaris (Reeve, 1843)

References

Liotiidae
Monotypic gastropod genera